The Daytime Emmy Award for Outstanding Lead Actor in a Drama Series  is an award presented annually by the National Academy of Television Arts and Sciences (NATAS) and Academy of Television Arts & Sciences (ATAS).  It is given in honor of an actor who has delivered an outstanding performance in a leading role while working within the daytime drama industry.

The 1st Daytime Emmy Awards ceremony was held in 1974 with Macdonald Carey receiving the award for his portrayal of Tom Horton on Days of Our Lives. The award has undergone several name changes, originally honoring  actors in leading and supporting roles. Following the introduction of a new category in 1979, Outstanding Supporting Actor in a Drama Series, the award's name was altered to Outstanding Actor in a Drama Series before changing once again, to its current title, years later. The awards ceremony was not aired on television in 1983 and 1984, having been criticized for lack of integrity. In 1985, another category was introduced, Outstanding Younger Actor in a Drama Series, one criterion for this category was altered, requiring all actors to be age 26 or younger.

Since its inception, the award has been given to 26 actors. General Hospital has the most awarded actors in this category with a total of twelve wins. In 1979, Al Freeman, Jr. became the first African-American to have garnered the award, winning for his role as Ed Hall on One Life to Live. In 2008, Anthony Geary became the actor with the most wins in the category when he won for a sixth time, surpassing David Canary's previous record. Geary went on to win again in 2012 and 2015, thus far winning on eight occasions. Peter Bergman has been nominated on 23 occasions, more than any other actor. 

As of the 2022 ceremony, John McCook is the most recent winner in this category for his portrayal of Eric Forrester on The Bold and the Beautiful.

Winners and nominees
Listed below are the winners of the award for each year, as well as the other nominees.

1970s

1980s

1990s

2000s

2010s

2020s

Multiple wins and nominations

The following individuals received two or more wins in this category:

The following individuals received two or more nominations in this category:

Series with most awards

References

External links
 

Daytime Emmy Awards
Emmy
Awards established in 1974
1974 establishments in the United States